Bancários is a neighborhood located at Ilha do Governador in the North Zone of Rio de Janeiro, Brazil. As of 2010 it has a population of 12,512.

References

Neighbourhoods in Rio de Janeiro (city)